Oliver Schmidt (born 14 September 1973) is a German former footballer. He began his career with Hertha BSC, alongside his twin brother Andreas. Together they were part of the Hertha reserve team that reached the final of the DFB-Pokal in 1993. Oliver Schmidt left Hertha in 1998, one year after the club had achieved promotion to the Bundesliga. He played for five more clubs before retiring in 2007.

External links

1973 births
Living people
German twins
Footballers from Berlin
German footballers
Germany under-21 international footballers
Association football defenders
Hertha BSC players
Hertha BSC II players
SpVgg Greuther Fürth players
SSV Jahn Regensburg players
FC Augsburg players
FC Ingolstadt 04 players
VfR Mannheim players
Bundesliga players
Twin sportspeople
West German footballers